The Wee County may refer to two 'wee' (i.e. 'small') counties:

 Clackmannanshire, Scotland, the smallest county in Britain 
 County Louth, the smallest county in Ireland